Shad Bay is a rural  community on the Chebucto Peninsula in the Halifax Regional Municipality on the shore of the Atlantic Ocean on (Route 333 ), 16.3 kilometers from Halifax, in Nova Scotia, Canada.

Electoral district 
 Federal - Halifax West
 Provincial -Timberlea - Prospect
schools:1(Atlantic Memorial)

External links
Shad Bay history
Explore HRM
Photo Fisheries and Oceans Canada

Communities in Halifax, Nova Scotia
General Service Areas in Nova Scotia